Eufaula High School is an American secondary school in Eufaula, Oklahoma that is operated by Eufaula Public Schools. It serves grades 9 through 12.

Notable Alumni
 Dewey Selmon Linebacker University of Oklahoma, played in the NFL for Tampa Bay Buccaneers (1976-1981) and San Diego Chargers (1982).
 Lee Roy Selmon Defensive End University of Oklahoma, played in the NFL for Tampa Bay Buccaneers (1976-1984). He is a member of the College Football Hall of Fame and the Pro Football Hall of Fame.
 Lucious Selmon Noseguard University of Oklahoma, played in the World Football League for Memphis Southmen (1974-1975), former coach at the college and pro levels.

References

Public high schools in Oklahoma
Schools in McIntosh County, Oklahoma